Masoga is a genus of moths of the family Erebidae. The genus was erected by Francis Walker in 1863.

Species
Masoga bipunctoides Poole, 1989 Argentina (Tucuman)
Masoga panagralis Walker, 1863 Brazil (Rio de Janeiro)
Masoga peracuta (Dognin, 1914) Brazil (Rio de Janeiro)
Masoga rava (Schaus, 1913) Costa Rica

References

External links
 

Calpinae